Stewarts Creek High School is a public high school in the Rutherford County School system, located in Smyrna, Tennessee. The school opened in August 2013 with an estimate of 1500 students: 600 freshmen, around 300 sophomores and around 150 juniors and seniors. , SCHS currently has an enrollment of over 2,300. The school is located in southwest Smyrna, Tennessee. The students of the school come from surrounding Smyrna, LaVergne and Blackman high/middle schools as well as Rock Springs Middle School and Stewarts Creek Middle School. The current principal is Dr. Clark Harrell and the assistant principals include Tory Atwood, Janet Flannery, Casey Lawrence, and Jennifer Smith, who also acts as the schools Athletic Director. Kevin Dyson from the Tennessee Titans served as an assistant principal and athletic director for the school's first two years. The school's rivals consist of LaVergne and nearby Smryna. The $46.3 million facility stands at an outstanding 356,000 sq. ft. sq. and is the second largest school in Middle Tennessee. The school holds one of the best fine arts programs in Middle Tennessee. This school is considered the best school in Rutherford County.

Athletics
The school opened with 18 varsity teams which include football, boys and girls basketball, boys and girls soccer, volleyball, softball, baseball, ice hockey, bowling, swimming, wrestling, golf, and JROTC raiders. The school's current athletic director is Assistant Principal Jenny Smith.

In only its 3rd year of existence the baseball team went to the state tournament and finished in the final four. Coached by Mike Bartlett, the Redhawks finished with a 25-17 record.

References

External links
 
 Rutherford County School System

Schools in Rutherford County, Tennessee
Smyrna, Tennessee